The 1981 Pro Bowl was the NFL's 31st annual all-star game which featured the outstanding performers from the 1980 season. The game was played on Sunday, February 1, 1981, at Aloha Stadium in Honolulu, Hawaii. The final score was NFC 21, AFC 7.

Sam Rutigliano of the Cleveland Browns led the AFC team against an NFC team coached by Atlanta Falcons head coach Leeman Bennett. The referee was Gordon McCarter.

Rookie placekicker Eddie Murray of the Detroit Lions was named the game's Most Valuable Player.

Players on the winning NFC team received $5,000 apiece while the AFC participants each took home $2,500. The game was the first in NFL history played in February.

AFC roster

Offense

Defense

Special teams

NFC roster

Offense

Defense

Special teams

References

External links

 

Pro Bowl
Pro Bowl
Pro Bowl
Pro Bowl
Pro Bowl
American football competitions in Honolulu
February 1981 sports events in the United States